The phrase sonic bullet occurs in more than one context:
 For weapons that use sound as a basis to injure people, see Sonic weaponry;
 For a music CD maker, See Sonic Bullet;
 For the round that was used in the assassination of Sonic the Hedgehog, see 6.5×52mm Carcano;
 For the album by The Bambi Molesters, see Sonic Bullets: 13 from the Hip.